Xinjian Subdistrict is a subdistrict in Zhanqian District, Yingkou, Liaoning province, China. , it has six residential communities under its administration.

See also 
 List of township-level divisions of Liaoning

References 

Township-level divisions of Liaoning
Yingkou